The 1949 Critérium du Dauphiné Libéré was the third edition of the cycle race and was held from 2 June to 7 June 1949. The race started and finished in Grenoble. The race was won by Lucien Lazaridès of the  team.

General classification

References

1949
1949 in French sport
June 1949 sports events in Europe